Jorge Martínez Salvadores, nicknamed "Aspar", (born 29 August 1962) is a Spanish former professional motorcycle racer and racing team manager. He competed in the Grand Prix road racing world championships from 1982 to 1997. After retiring from active competition, Martínez became a successful motorcycle racing team owner. He is one of the most successful motorcycle racers in Grand Prix motorcycle racing history with 22 Grand Prix victories to his name in the 80 cc class and a further 15 wins in the 125 cc class. In 2019, Martínez was inducted into the MotoGP Hall of Fame.

Motorcycle racing career
Martínez was born in Alzira, Valencia, Spain. He entered his first Grand Prix in 1982. Between 1986 and 1988, he claimed a total of four World Championships in these two categories, three times in the 80cc event and once at 125 cc. In 1988 he achieved the ‘double’, taking both crowns that year. His nickname was Aspar, a Spanish link with the shoe making industry which was given to him as a direct result of his father’s occupation as a cobbler.

Racing team owner
After his competitive career had ended in 1997, he went on to create and manage the Aspar Team. In the 2010 season, Aspar team rider Nicolás Terol finished in second place in the 125cc class while his teammate Bradley Smith finished fourth, both riding Aprilia RSA 125 motorcycles. Julián Simón finished in second place in the inaugural Moto2 campaign, with teammate Mike Di Meglio finishing in twentieth place on Honda-powered Suter chassis. Aspar rider Héctor Barberá finished in twelfth place in the MotoGP division aboard a Ducati Desmosedici GP10.

Martínez was inducted into the MotoGP Hall of Fame in 2019.

Complete Grand Prix motorcycle racing results 
Points system from 1969 to 1987:

Points system from 1988 to 1992:

Points system from 1993 onwards:

(key) (Races in bold indicate pole position; races in italics indicate fastest lap)

References

External links 
 Team Aspar web site
 Mapfre Aspar Aprilia web site

     

People from Ribera Alta (comarca)
Sportspeople from the Province of Valencia
Spanish motorcycle racers
Motorcycle racing team owners
50cc World Championship riders
125cc World Championship riders
1962 births
Living people
80cc World Championship riders
125cc World Riders' Champions